Ung or UNG may refer to:

People
 Woong, a Korean given name also spelled Ung
 Ung (surname), a Cambodian and Norwegian surname
 Ung Thị (full name  Nguyễn Phúc Ung Thị; 1913–2001), Vietnamese-born American businessman
 Franz Unger (1800–1870), Austrian botanist, often abbreviated "Ung." in citations

Other uses
 Ung County, a county of the Kingdom of Hungary, now parts of Slovakia and Ukraine
 Kiunga Airport, Papua New Guinea (IATA: UNG)
 Ngarinyin language, an Australian Aboriginal language (ISO 639-3: ung)
 State University of Gorontalo (Universitas Negeri Gorontalo), a university in Indonesia
 University of North Georgia, Georgia, United States
 Uracil-DNA glycosylase, a human gene

See also

Ong (disambiguation)